Edwin Kennedy Wright, also known as Pinky (December 28, 1898 – September 3, 1983). was a career US Army officer and Deputy Director of the US Central Intelligence Agency.

Biography
Wright was born on December 28, 1898, in Portland, Oregon.  He attended Oregon State College and enlisted in military service in 1920 with the Oregon National Guard.  He was commissioned as a second lieutenant in the regular Army on July 3, 1923.

Wright achieved distinction as an Armored Force (tank corps) Instructor and G-3 operations officer.  During World War II, he became an intelligence briefing officer on the staff of General Omar N. Bradley at 12th US Army Group in Europe. After the war, Wright became executive director of the Intelligence Division, US Army general staff in the War Department (Feb-Jun 1946) under General George C. Marshall. On Bradley's recommendation, Wright became Deputy G-2 under then Army-Air Forces Major General Hoyt S. Vandenberg (G-2).

President Harry Truman appointed Vandenberg to replace Admiral Sidney Souers as the second Director of Central Intelligence (CIG-CIA) on January 20, 1946.  Wright became Vandenberg's Executive to the Director of CIG the same date. The National Security Act of 1947, signed into law by Truman, gave legislative authority to the new Central Intelligence Agency (CIA).

Wright was promoted to brigadier general on February 3, 1947, becoming the first deputy director of Central Intelligence (DDCI) (1947-1949), serving under both Vandenberg and his successor (the third DCI) Adm. Roscoe Hillenkoetter. Hillenkoetter and the new defense secretary, James Forrestal, injected DDCI Wright into interagency disputes over which department was to direct 'black activities' under clandestine operations. General Wright insisted that the CIA "was and had to be the sole agency to conduct organized foreign clandestine operations."

In 1949, Wright was assigned to General Douglas MacArthur's G-3 operations staff at headquarters Far East Command (Tokyo).  He was promoted to Major General on March 8, 1952, becoming Commander of the US Military District of Washington (1952-1954), then took over as commanding general of the 6th US Army Infantry Division at Fort Ord, California.

Wright retired on September 30, 1955. He was awarded the Silver Star Medal (1950 - for "conspicuous gallantry and intrepidity in action against the enemy in Korea") followed by the Army Distinguished Service Medal (1952).

Wright died on September 3, 1983, at age 85.

References

1898 births
1983 deaths
United States Army generals
Recipients of the Silver Star